Brice Oakley (born February 4, 1937) is an American politician who served in the Iowa House of Representatives from the 78th district from 1973 to 1977.

References

1937 births
Living people
Republican Party members of the Iowa House of Representatives